"Don't Pull Your Love" is a song written by Brian Potter and Dennis Lambert which became a top ten hit single in 1971 for Hamilton, Joe Frank & Reynolds.

Hamilton, Joe Frank & Reynolds recording

Background

Rumored to have been written with Elvis Presley in mind, and first recorded (as "Don't Pull Your Love Out") in 1970 by Country Store—an obscure group produced by the song's writers Lambert and Potter—"Don't Pull Your Love" had been optioned by ABC-Dunhill Records A&R vice-president Steve Barri to be recorded by the Grass Roots whom Barri had been producing for five years: however the Grass Roots passed on the song, which Barri recalls the group considered "a bit light[weight]". Joe Frank Carollo would recall how he and his fellow band members Dan Hamilton and Tommy Reynolds were performing a Creedence Clearwater Revival medley to audition for ABC-Dunhill when Steve Barri stopped the trio to play them the demo of "Don't Pull Your Love" two or three times til the trio themselves could sing it for Barri, who resultantly arranged for Hamilton, Joe Frank & Reynolds to be signed to ABC-Dunhill that same day.

According to Steve Barri, Hamilton, Joe Frank & Reynolds themselves played on the basic tracks for their recording sessions, on which Jimmie Haskell's horn and string arrangements were later overdubbed. The credits for their debut, which included "Don't Pull Your Love", entitled Hamilton, Joe Frank & Reynolds, lists the group members as musicians (Dan Hamilton on lead vocals and guitar, Joe Frank Carollo on bass guitar and Tom Reynolds on keyboards) with additional credits for drummer Joe Correro Jr. – formerly of Paul Revere & the Raiders – and keyboardist Larry Knechtel. Both Correro (Carollo's second cousin) and Knechtel were prolific session musicians with Knechtel - who also played bass - being a regular member of iconic Los Angeles session band the Wrecking Crew: it has been alleged that the instrumentation on "Don't Pull Your Love" was exclusively a work of the Wrecking Crew with the trio being relegated only to vocals, an allegation which Carollo has refuted ("we were self contained so we pretty much played on everything"), concluding that only Knechtel and Correro, as session musicians, played on the "Don't Pull Your Love" session. An instrumental entitled "Funk-in-Wagnal", credited to the group's members, was recorded to be B-side of "Don't Pull Your Love".

Recorded in December 1970, "Don't Pull Your Love" was released April 1971 and reached No. 4 on the Billboard Hot 100 dated 31 July 1971, in which month the single was certified gold for sales of one million units (Billboard also afforded "Don't Pull Your Love" a No. 4 ranking on the magazine's Easy Listening chart). On the Top 100 Singles chart in Cash Box dated 31 July 1971, "Don't Pull Your Love" was ranked at #1. In Canada, "Don't Pull Your Love" spent one week at number one.

Chart performance

Weekly charts

Year-end charts

Cover versions

Sam & Dave
The song was recorded by Sam & Dave in 1971. Their version was released on Atlantic Records in October 1971 and reached number 36 on the Billboard R&B chart. It can be found on various "best of" Sam & Dave collections that are currently available.

Glen Campbell medley
The lead single from the 1976 Glen Campbell album Bloodline - which was produced by Dennis Lambert and Brian Potter - was a medley of "Don't Pull Your Love" with the John D. Loudermilk composition "Then You Can Tell Me Goodbye". Lambert and Potter had previously been responsible for Campbell's massive 1975 comeback album Rhinestone Cowboy. "Don't Pull Your Love"/ "Then You Can Tell Me Goodbye" was far less successful than either of the singles off Rhinestone Cowboy, the medley just scraping the top 30 of the Hot 100 in Billboard, performing much better on the magazine's airplay-driven C&W and Easy Listening charts. "Don't Pull Your Love"/ "Then You Can Tell Me Goodbye" was a major hit in Canada, reaching number 2 on the country chart and number 1 on the pop chart. Campbell performed the medley in 1977 with Cher on the Sonny & Cher Show on CBS.

Chart performance

Sean Maguire cover

In 1996, the song was covered by English actor/singer Sean Maguire, and released as his seventh single. It was the fourth and final single from his second album Spirit and reached number 14 on the UK Singles Chart.

Track listing
CD1

CD2

Other versions
"Don't Pull Your Love" was performed by Rob Paulsen in the animated movie Batman and Harley Quinn; Paulsen sang it as twin henchmen Min and Max, working for Two-Face, in a henchpersons' tavern that Harley visits with Batman and Nightwing, seeking information on Poison Ivy.

The Grass Roots who passed on the song were performing it in concert by 1996, with their live version - entitled "Don't Pull Your Love Out on Me Baby" - being included on the group's 2000 concert album Live at Last.

The song was also recorded by the Lettermen (album Love Book/ 1971), Sammy Babitzin (as "Kuin Tuhka Tuuleen" Finnish: album Sammy/ 1973): also a 1972 single release), and Guys 'n' Dolls (album The Good Times/ 1976), the last-named modifying the song to a duet with the lead vocals split between Dominic Grant and Martine Howard. Jimmy Helms had a 1975 single release of "Don't Pull Your Love".

References

External links
 

1971 songs
1971 debut singles
Hamilton, Joe Frank & Reynolds songs
1996 singles
Glen Campbell songs
Sean Maguire songs
Cashbox number-one singles
RPM Top Singles number-one singles
Songs written by Brian Potter (musician)
Songs written by Dennis Lambert
Capitol Records singles
Dunhill Records singles
ABC Records singles
Parlophone singles